During the 2001–02 English football season, Portsmouth F.C. competed in the Football League First Division.

Season summary
Portsmouth started the season promisingly but slumped during the winter and were involved in a relegation battle for the second half of the season. A string of poor results, including a 4–1 home loss in the FA Cup to bottom of the Football League Leyton Orient, meant that Director of Football Harry Redknapp was given more responsibilities until he eventually replaced Rix as team manager toward the end of the season. The goals of striker Peter Crouch and the creativity of veteran Croatian midfielder Robert Prosinečki played a crucial role in saving Portsmouth from relegation. Despite only spending the one season with the club before moving to Slovenian side Olimpija Ljubljana, such was the role Prosinečki played that he is now widely regarded as one of the greatest players to ever grace Fratton Park. Crouch was sold to Aston Villa near the end of the season for £5 million, which was used in the ensuing summer to rebuild the squad.

Tragedy struck the club six days before the start of the season when goalkeeper Aaron Flahavan was killed in a car crash near Bournemouth on 5 August. Both Portsmouth and Flahavan's youth club Southampton retired the number 1 jersey during the season, out of respect for Flahavan, who had played more than 100 games for Portsmouth since making his debut five years earlier.

Kit
Portsmouth retained the previous season's kit, manufactured by the club's own brand, Pompey Sport, and sponsored by Bishop's Printers.

Final league table

Results summary

Results by round

Results
Portsmouth's score comes first

Legend

Football League First Division

FA Cup

League Cup

Squad

Left club during season

References

Portsmouth F.C. seasons
Portsmouth